Conopomorpha heliopla is a moth of the family Gracillariidae. It is known from the Australian states of Tasmania, Queensland and Western Australia.

The larvae feed on Acacia species. They feed in the surface of galls produced by the rust Uromycladium and other organisms.

References

Conopomorpha
Moths described in 1907